The Modèle 1951 helmet was a military helmet used by the French military (Army, Navy, Air Force and Gendarmerie), iconic of the Algerian War. It replaced a variety of helmets used during the Second World War, including the Adrian helmet, Modèle 1945 helmet and American-supplied M1 Helmet.

Development
The Modèle 1951 was designed to have the same general shape as the US M1 Helmet, in an effort towards standardisation within NATO. The two differ in that the M1 has a longer visor and a more pronounced downwards slope on the sides. The M1 also has a nape strap while the Modèle 1951 does not.

Description
The Modèle 1951 comprised a heavy external cover, made of 1.2 mm of an amagnetic alloy of manganese steel, and a lighter inner helmet.

The Modèle 1951 was produced until 1976, before being superseded by the Modèle 1978 helmet. It nonetheless remained in service well into the 1980s.

Operators

 - French Armed Forces, Gendarmerie Nationale
  - Burkina Faso Armed Forces
 - Khmer National Armed Forces
 - Cameroon Armed Forces
 Kingdom of Laos - Royal Lao Armed Forces, Royal Lao Police
 - Indian Armed Forces, Indian Police Service
 - Israel Defense Forces
 - Armed Forces of the Republic of Ivory Coast, National Gendarmerie
 - Kenya Defence Forces, Kenya Police
 - Lebanese Armed Forces, Internal Security Forces
 - Royal Moroccan Armed Forces, Royal Moroccan Gendarmerie
 - Pakistan Armed Forces and paramilitaries
 - Portuguese Army, Portuguese Republican National Guard
 - Rhodesian Army, British South Africa Police
 - Armed Forces of Senegal, National Gendarmerie
 - Vietnamese National Army, Republic of Vietnam Military Forces
 - South African Defence Force, South African Police
 - Tunisian Armed Forces, Tunisian National Guard

Non-state operators
 Al-Mourabitoun - Seized from Lebanese Armed Forces stocks.
 Army of Free Lebanon - Seized from Lebanese Armed Forces stocks.
 Hezbollah - Seized from Lebanese Armed Forces stocks.
 Lebanese Arab Army - Seized from Lebanese Armed Forces stocks.
 Lebanese Forces - Seized from Lebanese Armed Forces stocks or provided by Israel.
 People's Liberation Army (Lebanon) - Seized from Lebanese Armed Forces stocks. 
South Lebanon Army - Seized from Lebanese Armed Forces stocks or provided by Israel.
 Tigers Militia - Seized from Lebanese Armed Forces stocks. 
 UNITA/FALA - Seized from Portuguese Army stocks or provided by South Africa.
 Palestine Liberation Organization - Seized from Lebanese Armed Forces stocks.
 Polisario Front - captured from the Royal Moroccan Army or provided by Algeria.

See also
Modèle 1978 helmet
SPECTRA helmet

External links 

 Le modèle militaire 1951
 le casque français modèle 1951

Combat helmets of France
Military equipment introduced in the 1950s